The 1984–85 IHL season was the 40th season of the International Hockey League, a North American minor professional league. Nine teams participated in the regular season, and the Peoria Rivermen won the Turner Cup.

Regular season

Turner Cup-Playoffs

External links
 Season 1984/85 on hockeydb.com

IHL
International Hockey League (1945–2001) seasons